Ryan Whitney (born February 19, 1983) is an American former professional ice hockey defenseman. He is an analyst on NHL Network and a co-host of the Barstool Sports hockey podcast Spittin' Chiclets with former NHL enforcer Paul Bissonnette. In 2019, New Amsterdam Vodka collaborated with Whitney to create a pink lemonade flavored vodka called Pink Whitney.

Whitney represented the United States in international competitions, winning a silver medal at the 2010 Winter Olympics.

Upon completing his freshman year at Boston University, Whitney was selected by the Pittsburgh Penguins fifth overall in the 2002 NHL Entry Draft. Following three seasons with the Penguins' minor league affiliate, the Wilkes-Barre/Scranton Penguins, Whitney played his NHL rookie season in 2005–06. Whitney remained in Pittsburgh for three-and-a-half seasons, helping the club to the 2008 Stanley Cup Finals. He was traded to the Edmonton Oilers in 2010 after a brief stint with the Anaheim Ducks. On September 20, 2015, Whitney announced his retirement from professional hockey.

Playing career

Early years 
As a youth, Whitney played in the 1997 Quebec International Pee-Wee Hockey Tournament with a minor ice hockey team from the South Shore.

Whitney enrolled at Thayer Academy, a college-prep school in Braintree, Massachusetts, in 1998, and logged significant playing time with their hockey team. Head Coach Jack Foley often paired Whitney, a freshman, with senior Brooks Orpik, his future rival in college (being on separate ends of the Boston College-Boston University Rivalry), and later his teammate on the Pittsburgh Penguins. Whitney's size and skill drew the attention of the USA Hockey National Team Development Program. After initially resisting the programs invitations, he left Thayer Academy for the program, based in Ann Arbor, Michigan, for his senior year of high school.

After graduating from high school, Whitney accepted a full scholarship to play for Boston University under Jack Parker. In his freshman year, he recorded 21 points in 35 games and was named to the 2002 Hockey East All-Rookie Team. He was then selected by the Pittsburgh Penguins, as the fifth overall pick in the 2002 NHL Entry Draft. Upon completing his third year with Boston, he opted to forgo his senior year of college eligibility to turn professional. He was subsequently assigned by Pittsburgh to their American Hockey League (AHL) affiliate, the Wilkes-Barre/Scranton Penguins, for the 2004 Calder Cup Playoffs. He played in 20 games, recording 10 points, however, Wilkes-Barre/Scranton was defeated by the Milwaukee Admirals in the finals.

Following his professional debut in the AHL playoffs, Whitney joined Wilkes-Barre/Scranton for the 2004–05 season. Under head coach Michel Therrien, Whitney played in 80 games in 2004–05, recording 41 points and 101 penalty minutes.

Pittsburgh Penguins 

Whitney made his NHL debut with Pittsburgh in the 2005–06 NHL season, playing in 68 games. He was called up on October 31, 2005, to replace injured defenseman Dick Tärnström and remained on the team until the season ended. His first NHL goal came on December 1, 2005, against Henrik Lundqvist of the New York Rangers. Whitney finished the season with six goals and 32 assists.

In his second NHL season, Whitney emerged as a top offensive defenseman in the league with 59 points in 2006–07. Under the guidance of new general manager Ray Shero, the Penguins improved from a last-place finish in the Eastern Conference the year before, to a playoff berth, with Whitney part of the youth movement in Pittsburgh that included forwards Sidney Crosby, Evgeni Malkin, Jordan Staal and goaltender Marc-André Fleury.

During the 2007 off-season, Whitney signed a six-year, $24 million contract with a no-trade clause, avoiding his pending restricted free agency. His offensive production dropped in the subsequent 2007–08 season, posting 40 points in 76 games. However, the Penguins finished second in the Eastern Conference and Whitney contributed six points in the 2008 Stanley Cup Playoffs, as Pittsburgh made it to the Finals against the Detroit Red Wings. Pittsburgh was defeated in game six of the series on June 4, 2008.

In the 2008 off-season, it was revealed that Whitney had been suffering from a chronic foot injury throughout the season. It was later discovered Whitney was born with abnormally high arches (hollow foot) in both of his feet. After an attempt using orthopedic inserts in his skates failed, Whitney underwent osteotomy, a surgical procedure to realign the bones in his left foot, on August 15, 2008. It was expected Whitney would miss five months of the 2008–09 season. After playing one game with Wilkes-Barre/Scranton, as part of a conditioning stint, Whitney made his return to Pittsburgh, in a 2–0 loss to the Tampa Bay Lightning, on December 23, 2008.

Anaheim Ducks 
On February 26, 2009, Whitney was traded to the Anaheim Ducks in exchange for Chris Kunitz and Eric Tangradi. He scored one goal and five assists during the 2009 Stanley Cup playoffs, as the Ducks made it to game seven of the Western Conference Semi-Finals, losing to the Detroit Red Wings.

Edmonton Oilers 
On March 3, 2010, Whitney was traded along with a 2010 sixth round draft pick (Brandon Davidson) to the Edmonton Oilers in exchange for defenseman Ľubomír Višňovský. The deal marked the second time that Whitney had been traded within a year, even though he has a no-trade clause in his contract.

Whitney made his Oilers debut at Rexall Place on March 5, against the Minnesota Wild. His first goal for his new team would come later in the month, as the Oilers defeated the Detroit Red Wings on March 19. Whitney flourished in his new surroundings, as he finished the 2009–10 season in Edmonton with 11 points from 19 games, one of those goals coming against former team, Anaheim. He also tied with injured winger, Aleš Hemský, as the Oilers team leader for plus-minus totals, with +7.

Whitney underwent a second osteotomy in May 2010, this time to realign the bones in his right foot.

On December 28, 2010, in a game against the Buffalo Sabres, Whitney suffered from a right ankle injury. It was later announced that Whitney would miss the remainder of the 2010–11 season, needing surgery.

On April 28, 2013, it was announced Whitney would not be returning to the Oilers for a fifth season.

Florida Panthers 
On September 29, 2013, Whitney signed a one-year contract with the Florida Panthers. Whitney appeared scoreless in seven games with the Panthers to begin the 2013–14 season before on November 8, 2013, he was placed on waivers. Unclaimed, Whitney was assigned to the Panthers' AHL affiliate, the San Antonio Rampage, for the remainder of the season.

Abroad
Whitney was an unrestricted free agent following the 2013–14 season. After failing to sign a contract with an NHL team, Whitney made a move to the Kontinental Hockey League (KHL) and on October 16, 2014, he signed a contract with HC Sochi. In the 2014–15 season, Whitney scored 19 points in 42 games in the inaugural season for Sochi. As a free agent, Whitney left Russia after one season and signed a one-year contract with Swedish club Modo Hockey of the SHL on June 24, 2015. Whitney announced his retirement on September 20, 2015 via Twitter.

International play 

Whitney first represented USA Hockey at the 2000 World U-17 Hockey Challenge. He played six games, and scored his first international goal. The United States finished the tournament in fourth place.

A year later, he would play in the 2001 IIHF U18 Championships. Whitney picked up a single assist, in six games, as the United States finished in sixth place.

The next year, he moved onto the United States' U20 team at the 2002 World Juniors. It was here Whitney picked up his first international goal. He posted 3 points (one goals and two assists) in seven games, as the United States finished in fifth place.

He would also play the following year in the 2003 World Juniors. Whitney posted better numbers than the year previous, picking up five points (one goal and four assists) in seven games, as the United States finished in fourth place.

With injuries to fellow defensemen Paul Martin and Mike Komisarek, Whitney was selected as a replacement to represent the United States in the 2010 Winter Olympic Games, held in Vancouver, British Columbia. This marked Whitney's first time as an Olympic competitor. He and his team were runners-up and won the Silver Medal. It was Whitney's former teammate, Sidney Crosby, who scored the game-winning goal, which saw Canada defeat the United States 3–2, in overtime. Whitney played in all six games, not collecting any points.

During this time, Whitney also wrote a blog and hosted a podcast on Barstool Sports throughout the games, sharing his thoughts, feelings and experiences.

Personal life 
Whitney's younger brother Sean played collegiate hockey at Cornell University from the 2008–09 season to the 2011–12 season. In June 2022, Whitney went viral on social media for posting a video on Twitter about his frustrations during his time at Toronto Pearson International Airport.

Career statistics

Regular season and playoffs

International

Awards and honors

References

External links 

USA Hockey National Team Development Program

1983 births
American men's ice hockey defensemen
Anaheim Ducks players
Boston University Terriers men's ice hockey players
Edmonton Oilers players
Florida Panthers players
HC Sochi players
Ice hockey players from Massachusetts
Ice hockey players at the 2010 Winter Olympics
Living people
Medalists at the 2010 Winter Olympics
Modo Hockey players
National Hockey League first-round draft picks
Olympic silver medalists for the United States in ice hockey
People from Scituate, Massachusetts
Pittsburgh Penguins draft picks
Pittsburgh Penguins players
San Antonio Rampage players
Sportspeople from Plymouth County, Massachusetts
Thayer Academy alumni
USA Hockey National Team Development Program players
Wilkes-Barre/Scranton Penguins players
Barstool Sports people